Ichthyophagoi ("fish-eaters") and Latin Ichthyophagi is the name given by ancient geographers to several ethnically unrelated coast-dwelling peoples in different parts of the world.

Herodotus (book i. c. 200) mentions three tribes of the Babylonians who were solely fish-eaters, and in book iii. c. 19 refers to Ichthyophagi in Aethiopia. Diodorus Siculus and Strabo also referred to them all along the African coast of the Red Sea in their descriptions of Aethiopia.
Ptolemy speaks of fish-eaters in the Persian Gulf coasts, coast of the Red Sea, on the west coast of Africa and on the coast of the Far East near the harbour of Cattigara.
Pliny relates the existence of such people on the islands in the Persian Gulf.
According to Arrian, Nearchus mentions such a race as inhabiting the barren shores of the Gwadar and Pasni districts in Makrān. During the homeward march of Alexander the Great, his admiral, Nearchus led a fleet in Arabian Sea along the Makrān coast and recorded that the area was dry and mountainous, inhabited by the Ichthyophagoi or Fish-Eaters.
Pausanias locates them on the western (African) coast of the Red Sea.
They are a people group identified on the 4th century Peutinger Map, as a people of the Baluchistan coast. The existence of such tribes was confirmed by Sir Richard F Burton (El-Medinah, p. 144).
It is the name Laskaris Kananos used for the Icelanders in the 15th century.

See also
Troglodyti
Huteimi
Solluba
Eskimos

References

R. Bloch, «Ichthyophagoi», in Der Neue Pauly. Altertum. Stuttgart-Weimar, Verlag J. B. Metzler, vol. 5, 1998, p. 883.
O. Longo, «Un viaggio fra i mangiatori di pesci (dal Periplo di Nearco)», Atti e Memorie dell’Accademia Patavina di Scienze Lettere ed Arti, Memorie della Classe di Scienze morali Lettere ed Arti, XCVIII, parte III, 1986, p. 153-57.
O. Longo, «I mangiatori di pesce: regime alimentare e quadro culturale», Materiali e discussioni per l’analisi dei testi classici, 18, 1987, p. 9-56.
O. Nalesini, «Roman and Chinese Perception of a "Marginal" Coastal Population: Ptolemy's Far Eastern Ichthyophágoi», in The Prehistory of Asia and Oceania, Edited by G. Afanas’ev, S. Cleuziou, J. R. Lukacs and M. Tosi, Forlì, ABACO, 1996, p. 197-204.
Oscar Nalesini, "History and use of an ethnonym: Ichthyophágoi", in Connected Hinterlands: Proceedings of Red Sea Project IV held at the University of Southampton September 2008, edited by L. Blue, J. Cooper, R. Thomas and J. Whitewright. Oxford, Archaeopress, 2009, pp. 9–18.
J. Tkač, «Ichthyophagoi», in Paulys Real-Encyclopädie der classischen Altertumswissenschaft, neue Bearbeitung von G. Wissowa, Stuttgart, IX, 1916, coll. 2524–31.
H. Treidler, «Ichthyophagen», in Der Kleine Pauly, München, Beck’sche Verlag, vol. II, 1979, coll. 1333–34.

External links 
  The origins of the name on Livius.org 

Balochistan
Ancient peoples
Persian Gulf
Legendary tribes in Greco-Roman historiography